The 2017 Biathlon Junior World Championships was held in Osrblie, Slovakia from February 21 to February 28, 2017. There was a total of 16 competitions: sprint, pursuit, individual, and relay races for men and women.

Schedule
All times are local (UTC+2).

Medal winners

Youth Women

Junior Women

Youth Men

Junior Men

Medal table

References

External links
  

Biathlon Junior World Championships
2017 in biathlon
2017 in Slovak sport
Biathlon competitions in Slovakia
2017 in youth sport